Fortuna Arena (formerly known as Sinobo Stadium, Eden Aréna and Synot Tip Arena) is a football stadium, in Prague-Vršovice, Czech Republic. The stadium has a capacity of 19,370 people and it is the biggest and the most modern football stadium in the country.

It is the home venue of SK Slavia Prague and occasionally the Czech Republic national football team. In the 2010–11 and 2011–12 seasons, it was also the venue of Bohemians 1905 home matches. During the 2011–12 season the stadium hosted home matches for FC Viktoria Plzeň in the Champions League group stage. The stadium was used for the 2013 UEFA Super Cup.

History
In the early 1950s, Slavia was forced to leave its stadium at Letná and a new stadium was built at Eden in the Vršovice district. Its capacity was about 50,000 (mostly for standing). The wooden western (main) stand was taken from the old stadium at Letná, the rest of the stands were made of concrete. The stadium also featured an athletics track. The first match at this stadium took place on 27 September 1953, Slavia drew 1–1 against the team of Křídla vlasti Olomouc. Josef Bican scored the home team's goal.

Move
In the 1970s, it became apparent that Eden did not provide sufficient comfort for the visitors and started planning to build a new one in the same place. However, under the communist regime, the planning went quite slowly. Several projects were made, and the construction was finally to start in 1990. In 1989, Slavia moved temporarily to the nearby Ďolíček stadium (home of FC Bohemians Prague, now known as Bohemians 1905) and the eastern stand was torn down. However, the overthrowing of the communist regime in 1989 delayed the construction. In the meantime, Slavia moved to Stadion Evžena Rošického, a stadium on the Strahov hill, which is large but uncomfortable and poorly accessible.

In the early 1990s, the whole construction was cancelled and Slavia moved back to Eden. A temporary stand was built in the place of former eastern stand, but it was clear that Eden was outdated and Slavia needed a new home ground. Several more projects were made, but Slavia was unable to raise sufficient funds and there were some legal problems, as the premises were owned by the government and it took a lot of effort to transfer them to Slavia. In 2000, the stadium became ineligible to host Czech First League matches, so Slavia moved to the unpopular Strahov again.

New stadium

Slavia finally presented a project of the new stadium, but no construction started. In December 2003, the old Eden stadium was torn down and Slavia announced that the new stadium would be opened on 19 October 2005, however, by October 2005 the construction had not even started. It took another year to start. The project had to be scaled down to lower the construction cost from 1.8 billion Czech koruna to less than 1 billion. The construction eventually started in October 2006.

Despite the stadium not being fully finished, it was opened on 7 May 2008 with an exhibition match against Oxford University A.F.C. Many former Slavia stars (such as Pavel Kuka, Patrik Berger, Jan Suchopárek and Ivo Knoflíček) took part in this match, which Slavia won 5–0.

The first competitive match at the new stadium was played on 17 May 2008 against Jablonec, the match ended 2–2, Slavia secured the Czech First League title in this final match of the 2007/08 season.

In 2016, CEFC China Energy, who had previously purchased a majority stake in SK Slavia Prague, sought to buy a 70% stake in the stadium and announced plans to invest around €50 million (including the purchase price) to improve the stadium capacity and turn it into the main national stadium for the Czech Republic national team. In April 2017, it was announced that the details of the transaction have since changed and CEFC China Energy had purchased the stadium in full. The stadium was then renamed to Sinobo Stadium.

Sponsorship 
In July 2008, it was announced that betting company Synot Tip had made an agreement with E Side Property Limited, the owners of the stadium, regarding a sponsorship deal regarding one of the stands. In 2009, the stadium's name was officially changed to Synot Tip Arena.

In 2011, Natland Group were announced as the new majority owners of the stadium.

In 2012 it was announced that Synot would not be extending their sponsorship of the stadium past the end of the 2011–12 season.

In November 2018, the Chinese real estate company Sinobo Group became the majority owner of SK Slavia Praha, and the stadium was renamed Sinobo Stadium.

International matches 
Eden Arena has hosted 13 competitive matches and 4 friendly matches of the Czech Republic national football team.

Other uses

The stadium is occasionally used for other events beside football, such as concerts or other sports matches. In 2012, the Sokol slet,  a mass gymnastics event, was held here.

The stadium was used for the final rugby matches of the 2008 and 2009–10 KB Extraliga seasons.

There is a hotel and a fan shop in the northern stand, and various other facilities (bar, McDonald's, Komerční banka branch, offices) in the main stand.

List of concerts

Transport
The stadium is served by buses, trams, and trains, with stops for buses and trams using the name Slavia - Nádraží Eden while the train stop is called Praha-Eden. Trams run along Vršovická street, north of the stadium, while bus services 135, 136, 150 and 213 stop on U Slavie street, immediately west of the stadium. The nearest metro station is Želivského.

References

External links

 Homepage
 Stadium picture
 SK Slavia Prague
 Stadium Guide Article
 Photos of opening night from ouafc.com

Music venues in Prague
Football venues in Prague
Czech First League venues
SK Slavia Prague
Sports venues completed in 2008
2008 establishments in the Czech Republic
21st-century architecture in the Czech Republic